Fighting with Kit Carson is a 1933 American pre-Code
Mascot Pictures film serial. It was edited into a feature film by Al Dezel Productions in 1946 and released to theaters as a movie. Johnny Mack Brown starred as Kit Carson, and Betsy King Ross played his love interest, Joan Fargo. The film also starred Tully Marshall and both Noah Beery Sr. and Noah Beery Jr.

Cast
 Johnny Mack Brown as Kit Carson
 Betsy King Ross as Joan Fargo, aka Johnny Fargo
 Noah Beery, Sr. as Cyrus Kraft
 Noah Beery, Jr. as Nakomas, son of Dark Eagle
 Tully Marshall as Jim Bridge
 Edmund Breese as Matt Fargo
 Al Bridge as Reynolds, a henchman
 Edward Hearn as Morgan, a henchman
 Lafe McKee as Luke Foster
 Jack Mower as Carter, a henchman posing as Johnny's benefactor
 Maston Williams as Chuck, knife-throwing henchman
 Lane Chandler as Army Sergeant

Chapter titles
 The Mystery Riders
 The White Chief
 Hidden Gold
 The Silent Doom
 Murder Will Out
 The Secret of Iron Mountain
 The Law of the Lawless
 Red Phantoms
 The Invisible Enemy
 Midnight Magic
 Unmasked
 The Trail to Glory
Source:

See also
 List of American films of 1933
 List of film serials by year
 List of film serials by studio

References

External links

1933 films
1933 Western (genre) films
American black-and-white films
1930s English-language films
Mascot Pictures film serials
Films directed by Armand Schaefer
American Western (genre) films
1930s American films